The 2004 Asian Women’s Club Volleyball Championship was the 5th staging of the AVC Club Championships. The tournament was held in Almaty, Kazakhstan. The local club Rahat Almaty won the championship after finishing tied with 4-1 with the Chinese silver medalists Bayi Yiyang High-Tech District and bronze winners Chung Shan from Chinese Taipei. The result was resolved by the set ratio.

Results

|}

|}

Final standing

Awards
MVP:  Olga Grushko (Rahat)
Best Server:  Oxana Mikholap (Astana)
Best Blocker:  Olga Karpova (Rahat)
Best Receiver:  Polina Zborovskaya (Toumaris)
Best Setter:  Wu Hsiao-li (Chung Shan)
Miss Volleyball:  Onuma Sittirak (BEC World)

References

Asian Volleyball Confederation

V
Asian Women's Volleyball Club Championships
V